Cedarville is an unincorporated community in Gilmer County, West Virginia, United States. Cedarville has a post office that is no longer active with ZIP code 26611.

The Michael Smith House was listed on the National Register of Historic Places in 2006.

References

Unincorporated communities in Gilmer County, West Virginia
Unincorporated communities in West Virginia